"(I Just Wanna) B with U" is a song by English pop rock band Transvision Vamp released as the lead single from their third and final studio album, Little Magnets Versus the Bubble of Babble (1991). It was also the first of their singles to be co-written by Wendy James. After a two-year gap since their previous single, "Born to Be Sold", "B with U" reached number 30 on the UK Singles Chart and number 16 in Australia.

Track listings
The live tracks on the US releases were recorded at the Manchester Apollo on 24 October 1989.

7-inch and cassette single (TVV 10; TVVC 10)
A1. "(I Just Wanna) B with U"
B1. "Swamp Thang"
B2. "Straight Thru Your Head"

12-inch single (TVVT 10)
A1. "(I Just Wanna) B with U" (The Nightripper mix)
B1. "Swamp Thang"
B2. "Straight Thru Your Head"

12-inch gatefold single (TVVTG 10)
A1. "(I Just Wanna) B with U" (The Nightripper mix)
B1. "Swamp Thang"
B2. "Straight Thru Your Head"
B3. "Punky Says"

CD single (DTVVT 10)
 "(I Just Wanna) B with U" (7-inch version) – 4:24
 "(I Just Wanna) B with U" (The Nightripper mix) – 4:53
 "Swamp Thang" – 3:48
 "Straight Thru Your Head" – 2:41

US 12-inch single (MCA12 54233)
A1. "(I Just Wanna) B with U" (The Nightripper mix) – 4:53
A2. "(I Just Wanna) B with U" (alternative 12-inch mix) – 6:02
B1. "Trash City" (live) – 5:14
B2. "Tell That Girl To Shut Up" (live) – 3:12
B3. "Sex Kick" (live) – 6:17
B4. "I Want Your Love" (live) – 3:40

US CD single (MCADS 54113)
 "(I Just Wanna) B with U" (album version) – 4:23
 "Trash City" (live) – 5:14
 "Tell That Girl To Shut Up" (live) – 3:12
 "Sex Kick" (live) – 6:17
 "I Want Your Love" (live) – 3:40
 "(I Just Wanna) B with U" (12-inch version) – 4:52*
 "(I Just Wanna) B with U" (12-inch version) is actually the Nightripper mix.

Charts

References

External links
 Worldwide releases

Transvision Vamp songs
1990 songs
1991 singles
MCA Records singles